Sæby is a town and seaport located on the east coast of the historical region of Vendsyssel in the Jutland peninsula in northern Denmark. The town is located in Frederikshavn municipality in Region Nordjylland. It has a population of 8,838 (1 January 2022). Sæby was granted market rights in 1524.

History
Until 2007 Sæby was the main town in Sæby municipality. Since 2007 part of Frederikshavn municipality.

Attractions
 Sæby Glassblowing Workshop
 Sæby Harbour
 Sæby Church
 Fruen fra Havet: 6,25 m. high statue standing on the pier at the entrance to Sæby harbour. The statue was made by artist Marit Benthe Norheim and it was inaugurated in 2001.
 Sæby Museum
 Sæby Old Town
 Sæby Teddies (two persons in teddy-bear costumes)
 Sæby Watermill
 Sæbygaard Manor: A manor house from the renaissance. Inside there is a small museum with exhibitions of historical furniture.
 Sæby Beach
 Sæby Townsquare

Notable people

Science & Business 
 Jacob Severin (1691 in Sæby – 1753) a Danish merchant who held a trade monopoly on Greenland from 1733 to 1749
 Sophus Frederik Kühnel (1851 in Sæby – 1930) a Danish architect, designed Mejlborg and a number of other buildings in Aarhus
 Adam Giede Böving (1869 in Sæby – 1957) a Danish-American entomologist and zoologist, studied the larvae of the order Coleoptera

The Arts 
 Henry Holst (1899 in Sæby – 1991) a Danish violinist, variously at the Berlin Philharmonic Orchestra, the Royal Manchester College of Music, the Royal College of Music and the Royal Danish Academy of Music.
 Carl Ottosen (1918 – 1972 in Saeby) a Danish actor, screenwriter and film director, appearing in 70 films 
 Walter Kuhlman (1918–2009) an American painter and printmaker, linked to Abstract Expressionism and American Figurative Expressionism, brought up in Sæby
 Jørgen Rømer (1923 in Saeby – 2007) a Danish art historian, graphic artist and painter
 Lene Siel (born 1968 in Saeby) a Danish singer

Sport 
 Merete Pedersen (born 1973 in Saeby) a Danish former footballer, member of the Danish national team for 16 years
 Rasmus Thellufsen (born 1997 in Saeby) a Danish footballer, playing for AaB

References

Cities and towns in the North Jutland Region
Frederikshavn Municipality